Harrison Fisher (July 27, 1875 or 1877 – January 19, 1934) was an American illustrator.

Career
Fisher was born in Brooklyn, New York City and began to draw at an early age. Both his father and his grandfather were artists. Fisher spent much of his youth in San Francisco, and studied at the San Francisco Art Association.  

In California he studied with Amédée Joullin.

In 1898, he moved back to New York and began his career as a newspaper and magazine illustrator, working for the San Francisco Call and the San Francisco Examiner, drawing sketches and decorative work. He became known particularly for his drawings of women, which won him acclaim as the successor of Charles Dana Gibson. Together with fellow artists Howard Chandler Christy and Neysa McMein, he constituted the Motion Picture Classic magazine's, "Fame and Fortune" contest jury of 1921/1922, who discovered the It-girl, Clara Bow. Fisher's work appeared regularly on the cover of Cosmopolitan magazine from the early 1900s until his death.

He also painted for books; his work included the cover for George Barr McCutcheon's Beverly of Graustark, and illustrations for Harold Frederic's The Market Place and Jerome K. Jerome's Three Men on Wheels.

Notes

References
Fisher, Harrison; Carrington, James Beebee. The Harrison Fisher book: a collection of drawings in colors and black and white. C. Scribner's sons, 1907
Welch, Naomi. The Complete Works of Harrison Fisher.

External links

Harrison Fisher at The Saturday Evening Post
 
 
Hearts and Masks by Harold MacGrath, illustrated by Harrison Fisher, from Project Gutenberg
The Princess Elopes by Harold MacGrath, illustrated by Harrison Fisher, from Project Gutenberg
 

1870s births
1934 deaths
American illustrators
People from Brooklyn
Artists from New York City